Body to Body may refer to:
 Body to Body (Blue System album), 1995 
 Body to Body (Technotronic album), 1991
 Body to Body, Job to Job, a 1991 compilation album by Swans
 Corps à corps or Body to Body, 2003 French language film starring Emmanuelle Seigner and Philippe Torreton